Ante Tomić (born April 22, 1970) is a Croatian left wing writer and journalist

A native of the village Proložac near Imotski, Tomić graduated with a joint honours degree in philosophy and sociology from the University of Zadar. He began to write as a reporter for the local daily newspaper Slobodna Dalmacija, showing in his articles great literary talent that would manifest itself in his 2000 debut novel Što je muškarac bez brkova. Three years later he wrote the novel entitled  which described the life of recruits in the Yugoslav People's Army. Both novels were adapted for the screen. Tomić co-authored the script for the 1999 film Posljednja volja, as well as that of the 2002 mini-series Novo doba.

Ante Tomić now writes for the newspaper Jutarnji list and in 2004 he travelled across the US to provide his newspaper's coverage of the presidential campaign by talking to the American electorate on the street. As of 2009, he has his own column Vlaška posla in Slobodna Dalmacija.

In 2017, Ante Tomić has signed the Declaration on the Common Language of the Croats, Serbs, Bosniaks and Montenegrins.

Works 

 Zaboravio sam gdje sam parkirao, collection of stories, 1997.
 Što je muškarac bez brkova, novel, 2000.
 Smotra folklora, 2001.
 , novel, 2003.
 Veliki šoping, collection of stories, 2004.
 Klasa optimist, 2004.
 Ljubav, struja voda i telefon, novel, 2005.
 Krovna udruga i druga drama (Anđeli pakla), collection of plays, 2005., with Ivica Ivanišević
 Građanin pokorni, 2006.
 Dečko koji obećava, collection of columns, 2009.
 Čudo u Poskokovoj Dragi, novel, 2009.
 Nisam pametan, collection of columns, 2010.
 Klevete i laži, collection of columns, 2011.
 Punoglavci, novel, 2011.

References

External links 
 

1970 births
Living people
Journalists from Split, Croatia
Croatian novelists
Male novelists
Croatian male short story writers
Croatian short story writers
Croatian male writers
Writers from Split, Croatia
Croatian satirists
21st-century Croatian writers
Croatian columnists
University of Zadar alumni
Croatian screenwriters
Golden Arena winners
Signatories of the Declaration on the Common Language
21st-century screenwriters